The Spanish protectorate in Morocco was established on 27 November 1912 by a treaty between France and Spain that converted the Spanish sphere of influence in Morocco into a formal protectorate.

The Spanish protectorate consisted of a northern strip on the Mediterranean and the Strait of Gibraltar, and a southern part of the protectorate around Cape Juby, bordering the Spanish Sahara. The northern zone became part of independent Morocco on 7 April 1956, shortly after France relinquished its protectorate. Spain finally ceded its southern zone through the Treaty of Angra de Cintra on 1 April 1958, after the short Ifni War. The city of Tangier was excluded from the Spanish protectorate and received a special internationally controlled status as Tangier International Zone.

Since France already held a protectorate over most of the country and had controlled Morocco's foreign affairs since 30 March 1912, it also held the power to delegate a zone to Spanish protection.

History

Background
At a time when most European nations were stepping up the acquisition of vast colonial empires, Spain was losing the last remnants of hers. Yet within a few years after the disastrous war of 1898 with the United States, which had forced Spaniards to acknowledge their secondary status among European military powers, their government found it necessary to show an active interest in expansion in northern Morocco. That country, if only because of its geographical position and the presence of the cities of Ceuta and Melilla, could not be ignored by the Spaniards despite their lack of enthusiasm for new colonial enterprises. During the last decades of the 19th century, Spain observed with apprehension the increasing influence of other European powers in the region. The most coherently expressed reason for intervention was fear for the strategic security of Spain. Among others, the Liberal leader Montero Ríos stated that if northwestern Morocco were to come under the civil or military protectorate of France, Spain would see itself besieged perpetually in the north and south by the same power. Furthermore, the then recent finds of iron ore near Melilla convinced many that Morocco contained vast mineral wealth.

The key motivation for intervention, although less openly stated, was the belief that Morocco was Spain's last chance to maintain its position in the Concert of Europe, as it was the one area in which it could claim sufficient interest to generate some diplomatic strength with respect to the European powers. There was also the widespread belief, in Spain as elsewhere in Europe at the turn of the 20th century, that the possession of colonies increased the prestige of a nation. Such beliefs made Spanish politicians more receptive to the adoption of a forward policy in Morocco.

Formation
In a convention dated 27 June 1900, France and Spain agreed to recognize separate zones of influence in Morocco, but did not specify their boundaries. In 1902, France offered Spain all of Morocco north of the Sebou River and south of the Sous River, but Spain declined in the belief that such a division would offend Britain.

What exactly "special consideration" meant was dealt with in the secret third and fourth articles, specifying that Spain would be required to recognise Articles 4 and 7 of the treaty but could decline the "special consideration" if she wished:

The British goal in these negotiations with France was to ensure that a weaker power (Spain) held the strategic coast opposite Gibraltar in return for Britain ceding all their influence in Morocco. France began negotiating with Spain at once, but the offer of 1902 was no longer on the table. Since France had given up her ambitions in Ottoman Libya in a convention with Italy in 1903, she felt entitled to a greater share of Morocco. On 3 October 1904, France and Spain concluded a treaty that defined their precise zones. Spain received a zone of influence consisting of a northern strip of territory and a southern strip. The northern strip did not reach to the border of French Algeria, nor did it include Tangier, soon to be internationalized. The southern strip represented the southernmost part of Morocco as recognized by the European powers: the territory to its south, Saguia el-Hamra, was recognized by France as an exclusively Spanish zone. The treaty also recognized the Spanish enclave of Ifni and delimited its borders.

In March 1905, the German Kaiser, Wilhelm II, visited Tangier, a city of international character in northern Morocco. There he loudly touted Germany's economic interests in Morocco and assured the Sultan of financial assistance in the event of a threat to Moroccan independence. At Wilhelm's urging, Sultan Abd el Aziz called for an international conference. The final act of the Algeciras Conference (7 April 1906) created the State Bank of Morocco, guaranteed the attending powers equal commercial rights in Morocco and created a native Moroccan police force led by French and Spanish officers.

The final Spanish zone of influence consisted of a northern strip and a southern strip centred on Cape Juby. The consideration of the southern strip as part of the protectorate back in 1912 eventually gave Morocco a solid legal claim to the territory in the 1950s. While the sparsely populated Cape Juby was administered as a single entity with Spanish Sahara, the northern territories were administered, separately, as a Spanish protectorate with its capital at Tetuán.

The Protectorate system was established in 1912. The Islamic legal system of qadis was formally maintained.

Rif War

Following the First World War, the Republic of the Rif, led by the guerrilla leader Abd el-Krim, was a breakaway state that existed from 1921 to 1926 in the Rif region, when it was subdued and dissolved by joint expedition of the Spanish Army of Africa and French forces during the Rif War.

The Spanish lost more than 13,000 soldiers at Annual in July–August 1921. Controversy in Spain over the early conduct in the war was a driving factor behind the military coup by General Miguel Primo de Rivera in 1923 which foreshadowed the Spanish Civil War of 1936–39.

After the successful 1925 Alhucemas landing, the French–Spanish alliance ended up achieving victory and putting an end to the war.

Second Spanish Republic
Before 1934, the southern part of the protectorate (Tekna) had been governed from Cape Juby (within the same southern strip) since 1912; Cape Juby was also the seat of Spanish West Africa. Then, in 1934, the southern part began to being managed directly from Tetuán (in the northern part of the protectorate) and the seat of Spanish West Africa was moved from Cape Juby to the territory of Ifni (not a part of the protectorate), which had been occupied by the Spaniards that year.

Spanish Civil War

The Spanish Civil War started in 1936 with the partially successful coup against the Republican Government, which began in Spanish Morocco by an uprising of the Spanish Army of Africa stationed there, although within a day uprisings in Spain itself broke out. This force, which included a considerable number of Moroccan troops (regulares), was under the command of Francisco Franco (who spent much time in Morocco) and became the core of the Spanish Nationalist Army. The Communist Party of Spain and Workers' Party of Marxist Unification (POUM), advocated anti-colonial policies, and pressured the Republican government to support the independence of Spanish Morocco, intending to create a rebellion at Franco's back and cause disaffection among his Moroccan troops. The government – then led by the Spanish Socialist Workers' Party (PSOE) — rejected that course of action as it would have likely resulted in conflict with France, the colonial ruler of the other portion of Morocco.

Because the locally recruited Muslim regulares had been among Franco's most effective troops, the protectorate enjoyed more political freedom and autonomy than Francoist Spain-proper after Franco's victory. The area held competing political parties and a Moroccan nationalist press, which often criticized the Spanish government.

World War II

Spanish troops provisionally occupied Tangier during World War II, on the pretext that an Italian invasion was imminent.

Retrocession to Morocco

In 1956, when France ended its protectorate over Morocco, Spain discontinued the protectorate and retroceded the territory to the newly independent kingdom, while retaining the plazas de soberanía which were part of Spain prior to the colonial period, Cape Juby, Ifni, and other colonies (such as Spanish Sahara) outside of Morocco. Unwilling to accept this, the Moroccan Army of Liberation waged war against the Spanish forces. In the 1958 Ifni War, which spread from Sidi Ifni to Río de Oro, Morocco gained Tarfaya (the southern part of the protectorate) and reduced the Spanish control of the Ifni territory to the perimeter of the city itself. Morocco and Spain negotiated for over a year over Ifni, with Morocco also wanting control of Ceuta and Melilla, while Spain was only willing to give up control of Ifni. On 5 January 1969 Morocco and Spain signed the treaty ceding Ifni to Morocco.

Spain considers both cities integral parts of the Spanish geography, since they were part of Spain for centuries.

Economy

Mines
The iron mines in the Rif were one of the sources of income. Their exploitation led to an economic boom in Melilla.

Transport

After the Treaty of Algeciras signed in April 1906, where the northern part of Morocco was placed under Spanish administration, the Spanish started to develop this mineral-rich area, and numerous narrow gauge railways were built.

Administration
The administrative regime of the Protectorate is derived from the concept of protectorate itself, with a formal duality of authorities. On the one hand, there is a Moroccan administration, headed by a Khalifa, who exercised, by delegation of the Sultan, all his powers, mainly the legislative, which he exercised through the dahir (decree). He was also the highest religious authority. This government led by the Khalifa received the name of Makhzen and was divided into departments, like ministries, coordinated by the Grand Vizier. The ministers were the qadi al-qudat (chief or judge of judges), the Vizier of the Habus (inalienable patrimony whose income is destined to a pious or religious work or institution), the amin al-amlak and the amin al-umana (minister of Finance). It had an advisory council made up of two representatives from each of the five regions. The Khalifa was chosen by the Sultan from a pair proposed by the Spanish government. The first Khalifa was Mohammed Mehedi Ould Ben Ismael. Ishmael was the brother of Sultan Hassan I and later Sultan Hassan I was the great-uncle of the second Khalifa. The first Khalifa took office in Tetouan on 27 April 1913. Only two Khalifas held office until the independence of Morocco, Muley el Mehdi (between 1913 and 1923) and his son Muley el Hassán bin el Mehdi (who took office at the age of thirteen, ruling between 1925 and 1941 and 1945 and 1956).

The Spanish administration was led by a High Commissioner, formally accredited to the Khalifa but in fact the highest authority in the Protectorate. The High Commissary directed the political action of Spain in the Protectorate, and orders and instructions emanated from it. The high commissioner was assisted by various departments (Indigenous Affairs Development and Finance). There was a territorial controller in each of the regions, directly represented to the Delegation of Indigenous Affairs. Subordinate to him, there was a next level, with regional auditors and, finally, local auditors. The maintenance of order was in charge of the Regulares (forces of the Spanish army with "indigenous" Rif people) and the Indigenous Police. On the military side, the high commissioner was assisted by three commanders based in Ceuta, Melilla and Larache .

The administrative organization was arranged, at a general level, in this way: The High Commissioner was responsible for the direction of the Spanish action in the entire area and all the authorities (including the military) were subordinate to him. Among its activities were to intervene in the acts of the Khalifa, the regime of the cities in which the consuls acted as controllers, to dictate the general policy and to approve or direct, where appropriate, military operations. The Indigenous services departmentwas entrusted with the General Secretariat and advising on all matters relating to relations with the Kabyles, the inspection of the Islamic Justice Administration, relations with the Consular Jurisdiction for the protection of the natives and with the Sheriff for everything related to real estate and the vindication of property, the inspection of schools and health care centers and the Spanish missions in educational work.

In Morocco, there was no prior organization to ensure public health, except in Tangier, and the Spanish tried to remedy this deficiency, creating in 1916 the Health Inspectorate, within the Office of Indigenous Affairs. The Spanish had to overcome the distrust that Moroccans felt towards their healers and home remedies, carrying out large vaccination campaigns that contributed to the prestige of the protecting country. Along with health action, culture was the other pending subject for Moroccans, since teaching was closely linked to religion and consisted of memorizing the Koran. Spain entrusted the task of educating the population to the Delegation of Indigenous Affairs, which depended on a Board of Education that was created on 3 April 1913. This Board was born with the purpose of training the personnel who would be dedicated to this task and as an instrument to learn about geography, literature, history and the Moroccan law. To this end, a Center for Moroccan Studies was organized in the Free Institute of Diplomatic and Consular Careers and Arabic chairs were created in some business schools and an Arabic board was created in the Board for the Extension of Studies.

Subsequently, Indigenous Affairs offices were created in Melilla and Ceuta that exercised surveillance functions, somewhat similar, in the occupied regions. In 1937, in the middle of the Spanish Civil War, the territorial organization of Spanish Morocco was in charge of the High Commisoner of the Territory and a Lieutenant Colonel responsible for civil and military affairs.

The High Commissioner and the Khalifa had their respective residences in two adjacent palaces in Tétouan, which following Morocco's independence in 1956 have been merged into a single compound and repurposed as the Royal Palace of Tétouan.

See also

 List of Spanish high commissioners in Morocco
 List of Spanish colonial wars in Morocco
 Regulares

Notes

References

Sources

Further reading
Calderwood, Eric. 2018. Colonial al-Andalus: Spain and the making of modern Moroccan culture. Harvard University Press
"Min Khalifa Marrakesh Ila Mu’tamar Maghreb El Arabi." (From the caliph of the king of Morocco to the Conference of the Maghreb). (April 1947). El Ahram.
Wolf, Jean (1994). Les Secrets du Maroc Espagnol: L’epopee D’Abdelkhalaq Torres. Morocco: Balland Publishing Company
Ben Brahim, Mohammed (1949). Ilayka Ya Ni Ma Sadiq (To you my dear friend). Tetuan, Morocco: Hassania Publishing Company
Benumaya, Gil (1940). El Jalifa en Tanger. Madrid: Instituto Jalifiano de Tetuan
Villanova, José-Luis (2010). Cartographie et contrôle au Maroc sous le protectorat espagnol (1912–1956). MappeMonde vol.98

Former colonies in Africa
Former Spanish colonies
Former protectorates
Colonial history of Morocco
States and territories disestablished in 1956
Tétouan
20th century in Morocco
Morocco–Spain relations
States and territories established in 1912